Cato Mead (17611846; also spelled Meed) is the only known Black Patriot (American Revolutionary War veteran) buried west of the Mississippi River. Mead is buried in or near Montrose Cemetery in Montrose, Iowa.

According to historian Barbara MacLeish, who is researching a book on Cato Mead, he joined the 4th Connecticut Regiment of the Continental Army commanded by Colonel John Durkee of Norwich, Connecticut in 1776 or 1777. Other sources reveal that Mead was born in 1762 and that he enlisted as private on 1 March 1778 for a one-year enlistment serving in Captain John McGregor's Company. It is not entirely clear if he was a former slave. He served at Valley Forge from December 1777 through June 1778, where he contracted smallpox, spending two months in a Pennsylvania hospital. Early military records show Mead received solder's pay of $10.04 for service his in the Continental Army in July 1783. It is not known why he migrated to Iowa. While the exact grave location of Cato Mead is unknown, a marker stands at the Montrose Cemetery.

Sources 
Abigail Adams Chapter, Daughters of the American Revolution. Revolutionary War soldiers and patriots buried in Iowa. 1978.
Pierce's Register: Register of the Certificates Issued by John Pierce, Esquire, Paymaster General and Commissioner of Army Accounts for the United States, to Officers and Soldiers of the Continental Army Under Act of July 4, 1783, Issue 2 Volume 9, Issue 988 of Document, United States 63d Cong., 3d sess., 1915.

References

Year of birth uncertain
1846 deaths
People of Connecticut in the American Revolution
Connecticut militiamen in the American Revolution
18th-century American slaves
People from Lee County, Iowa
Black Patriots
Military personnel from Norwich, Connecticut
People of colonial Connecticut